Neostrengeria is a genus of crabs in the family Pseudothelphusidae, containing the following species:

Neostrengeria appressa Campos, 1992
Neostrengeria aspera Campos, 1992
Neostrengeria bataensis Campos & Pedraza, 2008
Neostrengeria binderi Campos, 2000
Neostrengeria botti Rodríguez & Türkay, 1978
Neostrengeria boyacensis Rodríguez, 1980
Neostrengeria celioi Campos & Pedraza, 2008
Neostrengeria charalensis Campos & Rodríguez, 1985
Neostrengeria gilberti Campos, 1992
Neostrengeria guenteri (Pretzmann, 1965)
Neostrengeria lasallei Rodríguez, 1980
Neostrengeria lemaitrei Campos, 2004
Neostrengeria libradensis Rodríguez, 1980
Neostrengeria lindigiana (Rathbun, 1897)
Neostrengeria lobulata Campos, 1992
Neostrengeria macarenae Campos, 1992
Neostrengeria macropa (H. Milne-Edwards, 1853)
Neostrengeria monterrodendoensis (Bott, 1967)
Neostrengeria niceforoi (Schmitt, 1969)
Neostrengeria perijaensis Campos & Lemaitre, 1998
Neostrengeria sketi Rodríguez, 1985
Neostrengeria tencalanensis Campos, 1992
Neostrengeria tonensis Campos, 1992

References

Pseudothelphusidae